Eleni Giannou (born 16 September 1993) is a Cypriot footballer who plays as a midfielder and the Cyprus women's national team.

Career
Giannou has been capped for the Cyprus national team, appearing for the team during the UEFA Women's Euro 2021 qualifying cycle.

References

External links
 
 
 

1993 births
Living people
Women's association football midfielders
Cypriot women's footballers
Cyprus women's international footballers
Apollon Ladies F.C. players
PAOK FC (women) players
Cypriot expatriate footballers
Cypriot expatriate sportspeople in Greece
Expatriate women's footballers in Greece
Hibernian W.F.C. players
Expatriate women's footballers in Scotland